The 1974–75 Quebec Nordiques season was the Nordiques' third season, as they were coming off a 38–36–4 record in 1973–74, earning 80 points, however, they failed to qualify for the post-season for the 2nd straight season.

The Nordiques would have to find a new head coach during the off-season, as Jacques Plante would come out of retirement and play with the Edmonton Oilers.  Quebec hired recently retired and former team captain Jean-Guy Gendron to become the club's 4th head coach in team history.  The club would also move from the Eastern Division to join the newly created Canadian Division, which consisted of the other 4 Canadian clubs in the league.

Quebec would start off the season very strong, and fight with the Toronto Toros for top spot in the division all season long.  Through 66 games, the Nordiques had a 42–24–0 record, 8 points ahead of the 2nd place Toros, however, the team would suffer through a 7-game losing streak, and the Toros would catch up to the Nordiques.  Quebec would win 4 of their final 5 games, and win the division championship, and make the playoffs for the first time in club history.

Offensively, the Nordiques were once again led by Serge Bernier, who finished 3rd in league scoring with 122 points, as he scored 54 goals and added 68 assists.  Rejean Houle put together a solid season, scoring 40 goals and earning 92 points, while new team captain Michel Parizeau had 74 points.  Marc Tardif, acquired by Quebec from the Michigan Stags during the season, scored 38 goals and earned 72 points in 53 games with the Nordiques.  J. C. Tremblay led the blueline with 72 points in 68 games, while Dale Hoganson chipped in with 9 goals and 44 points.  Pierre Roy led the club with 118 penalty minutes.

In goal, Richard Brodeur took the starters job, and won a team high 29 games while posting a 3.90 GAA in 51 games.  Serge Aubry backed up Brodeur, and won 17 games with a team best 3.71 GAA.

In the opening round of the playoffs, the Nordiques faced the Phoenix Roadrunners, who finished 4th in the Western Division with 86 points, 6 fewer than Quebec.  The Nordiques would win their first ever playoff game, defeating the Roadrunners 5–2 at Le Colisée.  Quebec went up 2–0 in the series with a solid 6–2 win, as the series moved west to Phoenix.  The Nordiques shutout the Roadrunners 3–0 to take a commanding 3–0 series lead, however, they could not complete the sweep, as Phoenix won game 4 in overtime.  The series returned to Quebec for game 5, and the Nordiques would win the game 4–2, and take the series in 5 games.

Up next for the Nordiques was the Minnesota Fighting Saints, who during the season, had a 42–33–3 record, earning 87 points, as they finished 3rd in the Western Division.  Minnesota defeated the New England Whalers in the first round of the playoffs.  The series opened in Quebec, and the clubs split the first two games, as the series shifted to Minnesota.  Quebec took a 2–1 series lead with a big 6–1 win in the 3rd game, however, the Fighting Saints fought back in game 4, evening the series with a 4–2 victory.  Quebec would easily win the 5th game, doubling Minnesota 6–3 at Le Colisée, and the Nordiques would close out the series in the 6th game, defeating Minnesota 4–2, and advance to the Avco Cup Finals.

Quebec would face the defending Avco Cup champion Houston Aeros in the finals.  The Aeros finished the season with a league best 106 points, and had easily beat the Cleveland Crusaders and San Diego Mariners to reach the finals.  Houston, led by Larry Lund and Gordie Howe were heavy favourites to win the series.  The series opened in Houston, with the Aeros defeating Quebec 6–2 in the series opener, then took a 2–0 series lead with a 5–3 win in the second game.  The series moved to Quebec for the next 2 games, however, it was the Aeros who continued to win, as they shutout the Nordiques 2–0 in the third game, and would sweep Quebec with a huge 7–2 victory in the fourth game, winning the Avco Cup for the second time in as many years.

Season standings

Schedule and results

Playoffs

Quebec Nordiques 4, Phoenix Roadrunners 1

Quebec Nordiques 4, Minnesota Fighting Saints 2

Houston Aeros 4, Quebec Nordiques 0

Season stats

Scoring leaders

Goaltending

Playoff stats

Scoring leaders

Goaltending

Draft picks
Quebec's draft picks at the 1974 WHA Amateur Draft.

References

SHRP Sports
The Internet Hockey Database

Quebec Nordiques seasons
Que
Quebec